The Eagle of Saint John is a heraldic eagle associated mostly with the Catholic Monarchs which was later prominently used during Francoist Spain (1939–77) and the Spanish transition to democracy (1977–81). It is sable with an or halo and feet of gules.

John the Evangelist, the author of the fourth gospel account, is symbolized by an eagle, often with a halo, an animal may have originally been seen as the king of the birds. The eagle is a figure of the sky, and believed by Christian scholars to be able to look straight into the sun. 
 
The better known heraldic use of the Eagle of St. John has been the single supporter chose by Queen Isabella of Castile in her armorial achievement used as heiress and later integrated into the heraldry of the Catholic Monarchs. This election alludes to the queen's great devotion to the evangelist that predated her accession to the throne. There is a magnificent tapestry with the armorial achievement of the Catholic Monarchs in the Throne Room of the Alcazar of Segovia.

The Eagle of St. John was placed on side of the shields used as English consort by Catherine of Aragon, daughter of the Catholic Monarchs, Mary I and King Philip as English monarchs. In Spain, Philip barely bore the Eagle of St John  in his armorial achievements.

The Eagle of the Evangelist was recovered as single supporter holding in 1939, 1945 and 1977 official models of the armorial achievement of Spain and it was removed in 1981 when the current coat of arms was adopted. The use of the eagle of St. John was exploited by the Spanish dictator Francisco Franco, who used it as a symbol of his regime.

Prominent examples of the use of St. John's Eagle in heraldry across the world include the heraldry or emblems of: Valparaíso City (Chile); Boyacá Department (Colombia); Catholic Archdiocese of Besançon (France); Mallersdorf-Pfaffenberg (Germany); Lima City (Peru); Kisielice, Kwidzyn District and county, Oleśnica Town and county (Poland); Gata and the 29th Infantry Regiment "Isabel la Católica" (Spain); Lääne county, Haapsalu town and Kuressaare town (Estonia); and the St. John's College (University of Sydney, Australia).

See also
Eagle (heraldry)
Symbols of Francoism
Yoke and arrows

References

Heraldic eagles
Fascist symbols